CBD Line may refer to:

 CBD Relief Line, a cancelled underground railway line in Sydney, Australia.
 Line 28 (Beijing Subway), also known as CBD Line, a rapid transit line under construction in Beijing, China.